Kevin Knopf (born 14 October 1996 from Berlin) is a former professional German darts player who has playing in the Professional Darts Corporation (PDC) events.

Nicknamed "The Button", Knopf first qualified for a PDC European Tour in 2019, when he qualified for the 2019 German Darts Championship.

Darts career
Knopf made his PDC European Tour debut for the 2019 German Darts Championship he defeating Scott Taylor 6–4 and losing to 2 times World Champions Adrian Lewis 3–6. 

Knopf reached the Semi finals on the 2019 German Darts Trophy, losing to Colin Rice of England 4–5.

Knopf left of the PDC in October 2020

References

External links

Living people
German darts players
Professional Darts Corporation associate players
1996 births
Sportspeople from Berlin